Liber Studiorum is a collection of prints by J. M. W. Turner. The collected works included seventy-one prints that he worked on and printed from 1807 to 1819. For the production of the prints, Turner created the etchings for the prints, which were worked in mezzotint by his collaborating engravers.

The original models for the printmakers to follow were mainly in sepia watercolour, sometimes with elements in pencil and other media, and are now in Tate Britain as part of the Turner Bequest.  Altogether there are over 100 paintings relating to the series, included some not published in the end.  There are also numerous less formal drawings and watercolour studies in the Tate of the same subjects made by Turner on the spot or later.

Subsequent to the initial printing, the late 19th, early 20th century artist Frank Short made successful reprintings with the plates, though many of the finer details had worn down.

The Liber Studiorum was an expression of his intentions for landscape art. Loosely based on Claude Lorrain's Liber Veritatis (Book of Truth); the plates were meant to be widely disseminated, and categorised the genre into six types: Marine, Mountainous, Pastoral, Historical, Architectural, and Elevated or Epic Pastoral. A museum is devoted to Turner's work in print form, the Turner Museum in Sarasota, Florida, founded in 1974 by Douglass Montrose-Graem to house his collection of Turner prints.  Other print rooms with full sets include Tate Britain, the Metropolitan Museum of Art, and the Art Institute of Chicago.

References

Further reading

1800s books
1810s prints
J. M. W. Turner
Collection of the Tate galleries
19th-century prints